Lokca is a village and municipality in Námestovo District in the Žilina Region of northern Slovakia.

History
In historical records the village was first mentioned in 1496.

Geography
The municipality lies at an altitude of 655 metres and covers an area of 24.199 km². It has a population of about 2346 people.

External links
https://web.archive.org/web/20070427022352/http://www.statistics.sk/mosmis/eng/run.html

Villages and municipalities in Námestovo District